KDEO may refer to:

 KDEO-LD channel 23, a low-powered television station in Denver, Colorado, United States 
 KECR 910 AM, a radio station in El Cajon, California, United States that previously used the KDEO calls from 1955–1977
 KKNE 940 AM, a defunct radio station in Waipahu, Hawaii, United States that previously used the KDEO calls from 1980–1994
 KDDB 102.7 FM, a radio station in Waipahu, Hawaii, United States that previously used the KDEO-FM calls from 1990–1998